Deh Shaib-e Olya (also Romanized as Deh Sha‘īb-e ‘Olyā; also known as Deh Sha‘īb-e Bālā) is a village in Derakhtengan Rural District, in the Central District of Kerman County, Kerman Province, Iran. At the 2006 census, its population was 102, in 27 families.

References 

Populated places in Kerman County